KAYH (89.3 FM) is a radio station broadcasting a Southern Gospel music format. Licensed to Fayetteville, Arkansas, United States, it serves the Fayetteville (North West Arkansas) area.  The station is currently owned by Bott Radio Network, through licensee Community Broadcasting, Inc.

External links

Southern Gospel radio stations in the United States
Moody Radio affiliate stations
Radio stations established in 1962
Bott Radio Network stations
AYH